Sepiolidae is a family of bobtail squid encompassing 15 genera in three or four subfamilies.

References

External links

Bobtail squid
Cephalopod families